Retaliation is a solo album by rapper Keak da Sneak. It was released on January 15, 2002, by Black Market Records, and was produced by Sean T, Keak da Sneak and One Drop Scott. It sold 2,500 copies on its first week on shelves.

Track listing
"So Quik"- 4:52 
"No Remorse"- 4:13 
"Get You Lit"- 4:38 
"Don't Wanna See Me"- 3:19 
"Squash Suckers"- 3:28 
"Welcome to Oakland"- 4:19 
"In This Game"- 4:10 
"Shockn Niggaz"- 3:46 (Featuring Killa Tay) 
"It's the Sneak"- 4:13 
"Industry Rule"- 3:44 
"Me Me No and Fuck with These"- 3:32 
"Out My Pocket"- 4:00 
"Ride Fo This"- 3:02 
"Got Me Lifted"- 3:43 
"Da Market"- 4:43 
"Life Ain't Playin With You"- 4:12 (Featuring Agerman)

References

2002 albums
Keak da Sneak albums